Isaac Kimeli (born 9 March 1994 in Uasin Gishu County, Kenya) is a Kenyan born Belgian middle- and long-distance runner. He won the silver medal in the 3000 metres at the European Indoor Championships. Kimeli earned a silver in the 5000 metres at the European U23 Championships. He took four individual medals at the European Cross Country Championships.

Kimeli won one Diamond League meeting, securing victory in the 5000 m at the 2019 Memorial Van Damme in Brussels (promotional event) with a personal best of 13:13.02.

Achievements

Competition record

National titles
 Belgian Athletics Championships
 1500 metres: 2014
 Belgian Indoor Athletics Championships
 3000 metres: 2022

Personal bests
 1500 metres – 3:36.51 (Marseille 2018)
 3000 metres – 7:47.48 (Rome 2020)
 3000 metres indoor – 7:44.17 (Ghent 2021)
 5000 metres – 13:04.72 (Montreuil 2022)
 10,000 metres – 27:22.70 (Stockholm 2021)
Road
 10 kilometres – 28:17 (Lokeren 2020)

References

External links

 

1994 births
Living people
Belgian male middle-distance runners
Belgian male cross country runners
Belgian male long-distance runners
Olympic athletes of Belgium
Athletes (track and field) at the 2020 Summer Olympics
Kenyan emigrants to Belgium
Naturalised citizens of Belgium